Celestial hierarchy can refer to:

 Celestial bureaucracy, in Chinese mythology
 De Coelesti Hierarchia ("On the Celestial Hierarchy"), a 5th century work by Pseudo-Dionysius the Areopagite
 Hierarchy of angels, systems of classifying and ranking angels
 Angels in Judaism
 Angels in Christianity
 Angels in Islam